Pip Edwards (born 1980) is an Australian fashion entrepreneur and creative director. She is co-founder of sportswear label P.E Nation. Edwards has been called "one of the most influential figures in the Australian fashion industry."

Early life 
Edwards was the music captain at Ravenswood School for Girls and grew up playing piano and singing. As a child, Edwards edited clothes, created bracelets and sewed ribbons onto singlets to display her fashion flair. Edwards took a Commerce and Law degree at the University of Sydney.

Career 
Edwards started her career working for three years in the global risk division at Pricewaterhouse Coopers before entering the fashion industry with her first role at Ksubi. She started as PR manager and then transitioned into the womenswear design team. Following that she worked for five years as Senior Creative and Accessories Designer for Sass & Bide where she met her now business partner, Claire Tregoning. Edwards moved on to General Pants Co. where she served as Design Director. 

In 2016, Edwards created her activewear brand, P.E. Nation with Tregoning. The brand focuses on a high fashion approach to activewear, leaning heavily on 1990s streetwear aesthetics, function and luxury. Edwards and the brand strive to make their products as sustainable as possible and ensure all suppliers are certified.

Personal life 

Edwards is the mother to one son who was born in 2006 with ex partner, Ksubi fashion designer Dan Single.

In 2020, Edwards dated retired Australian cricket captain Michael Clarke, but their relationship ended in early 2021.

Edwards lives in Sydney.

References

1980 births
Living people
Australian fashion designers
Australian women company founders
Australian company founders
Australian women fashion designers